Oliver King may refer to: 
Oliver King (c. 1432–1503), Bishop of Exeter, Bath and Wells, and restorer of Bath Abbey
Oliver King (composer) (1855–1923), British composer, pianist, organist, and conductor
 (born 1970), English snooker player

See also
King Oliver (1881–1938), American jazz player and bandleader
Olive Kelso King (1885–1958), Australian adventurer and mountain climber who served in World War I as an ambulance driver, volunteer, and aircraft examiner
Leroy Oliver King (1921–2004), American basketball player